Karuppur may refer to places in India:
 Karuppur, Salem, Tamil Nadu
 Karuppur, Kumbakonam, Thanjavur District, Tamil Nadu
 Karuppur, Pattukkottai taluk, Thanjavur District, Tamil Nadu
 Karuppur, Ariyalur